Rietvallei is a township west of Johannesburg, South Africa. 

It is located in the Mogale City Local Municipality of the West Rand District Municipality.

References

Populated places in the Mogale City Local Municipality
Townships in Gauteng